UCD Women's Soccer Club is an Irish association football club based in Dún Laoghaire–Rathdown. It is the women's association football team of University College Dublin. Founded in 1966, UCD are one of the oldest women's football clubs in the Republic of Ireland. Like the UCD men's team, the women's football team has competed in national competitions, such as the FAI Women's Cup and the Women's National League, as well as intervarsity competitions. UCD has also represented the Republic of Ireland in the UEFA Women's Cup. Between 2014 and 2018, following a merger, with DLR Waves, the club played in the Women's National League and FAI Women's Cup as UCD Waves. However in 2018 UCD withdrew from the WNL. DLR Waves was subsequently revived as a separate club, taking UCD Waves' place in the WNL.

History

Intervarsity level 
According to Professor Meenan's History of UCD Sport, the UCD women's association football team was founded in 1966, playing their first games in 1967, including one against Dublin University. However it was not until the early 1980s that the club began to play regularly. In 1983 and 1984 they finished as runners-up in the LSCAI Intervarsity Cup. In 1991 UCD joined the national colleges league, which was organised by the Ladies Soccer Colleges Association of Ireland (LSCAI) and then by the Women's Soccer Colleges Association of Ireland (WSCAI). The club won its first Colleges Premier Division title in 1994–95 with a 100% record and without conceding a goal all season. The club completed an Intervarsity double after also winning the Intervarsity Cup for the first time. A second Intervarsity double was completed in 1996–97.

FAI Women's Cup
UCD entered the FAI Women's Cup for the first time in 2002 and won it on their first attempt after defeating Shamrock Rovers 2–1 in the final. Goals came from captain Linda Greene and Carmel Kissane. Greene was the leading goal scorer for UCD and the captain during her 2 years playing at the University before transferring back to captain her old club Shamrock Rovers in 2004.  With a team that included Sylvia Gee, Mary Waldron, Valerie Redmond, Caroline Thorpe and Nora Stapleton, UCD retained the cup in 2003 after defeating Lifford Ladies in the final. Carmel Kissane scored both goals in a 2–0 win. Under coach Larry Mahony, UCD completed a three-in-a-row of FAI Women's Cup wins when they defeated Dundalk City 4–1 in the 2004 final. UCD were also finalists in 2006 but they lost 1–0 to the Mayo Ladies League.
As UCD Waves, the club were also runners up in 2014 and 2017.

Dublin Women's Soccer League
In 2002 UCD also began entering a team in the Dublin Women's Soccer League. After finishing as runners up in their debut season, UCD completed a four-in-a-row of DWSL titles between 2003 and 2006. 
 The also won the DWSL's main league cup competition, the DWSL Premier Cup in 2004, 2005 and 2007.

Women's National League era

Early seasons
The UCD women's team applied to join the Women's National League for the inaugural 2011–12 season. However their application fell through when the university couldn't guarantee them regular access to UCD Bowl. The men's football team and men's rugby union team were given priority access. During the 2011–12, 2012–13 and 2013–14 season the majority of UCD women's team and several alumni played in the WNL for other clubs. Louise Quinn, Dora Gorman, Julie-Ann Russell, Caroline Thorpe and Chloe Mustaki all played for Peamount United while Siobhán Killeen, Ciara Grant and Mary Waldron played for Raheny United. Nicola Sinnott also played for Shamrock Rovers before switching to Wexford Youths. Meanwhile, Dora Gorman, Julie-Ann Russell, Chloe Mustaki, Siobhán Killeen, Ciara Grant also played for UCD in intervarsity competitions and in 2013–14 they helped UCD win the WSCAI Premier Division and the WSCAI Futsal Cup.

UCD Waves
Before the start of the 2014–15 season it was announced that DLR Waves and UCD would merge. Eileen Gleeson, formerly of Peamount United, was appointed manager of the new team known as UCD Waves. A number of Peamount United players including Julie-Ann Russell, Aine O'Gorman, Karen Duggan, Dora Gorman, Chloe Mustaki and Emily Cahill all subsequently followed Gleeson to UCD Waves UCD student Ciara Grant also joined from Raheny United. In 2018 UCD withdrew from the WNL. DLR Waves was subsequently revived as a separate club, taking UCD Waves' place in the WNL.

UCD in Europe
After winning the FAI Women's Cup, UCD qualified three times to represent the Republic of Ireland in the UEFA Women's Cup. After Shamrock Rovers, UCD were the second women's team to represent the Republic of Ireland in Europe.

2003–04 UEFA Women's Cup – Group 6

2004–05 UEFA Women's Cup – Group 9

2005–06 UEFA Women's Cup – Group 2

Notable former players
Republic of Ireland women's internationals

 Ireland women's field hockey international
  Emily Beatty
 Ireland women's rugby union international
  Nora Stapleton

Managers
 Ian Nesbitt 1991-2000
 Linda Greene 2000-2003 player/manager
 Jason Carey 2002-2003 
 Pat Kavanagh 2003-2005
 Larry Mahony [2005-2008] [2011-2013] 
 Eileen Gleeson 2014-2017
 Noel Kealy

Honours 
First Team
FAI Women's Cup
Winners: 2002, 2003, 2004 : 3
Runners-up: 2006, 2014, 2017: 3
Dublin Women's Soccer League
Winners: 2003, 2004, 2005, 2006: 4
Runners-up: 2002: 1
DWSL Premier Cup
Winners: 2004, 2005, 2007 : 3
Women's National League
Runners-up: 2014–15, 2016: 2
WNL Cup
Runners-up: 2016: 1
Intervarsity
LSCAI/WSCAI Premier Division
Winners: 1994–95, 1996–97, 1997–98, 2002–03, 2013–14: 5
Runners-up: 2012–13: 1
LSCAI/WSCAI First Division
Winners: 1992–93, 2007–08: 2
LSCAI/WSCAI Intervarsity Cup
Winners: 1994–95, 1996–97: 2
Runners-up: 1983, 1984, 2006–07, 2008–09 : 4
LSCAI/WSCAI Intervarsity Challenge Cup
Winners: 2007–08: 1
WSCAI Intervarsity Plate
Winners: 2001–02, 2002–03: 2
Runners-up: 2007–08, 2011–12 : 2
UCG Galway Plate
Winners: 1996–97, 1995–96, 1994–95, 1993–94: 4
WSCAI Futsal Cup
Winners: 2007–08, 2005–06, 2002–03, 2007–08, 2013–14: 6

References

External links
 UCD Women's Soccer Club on Facebook
   UCD Women's Soccer Club on Twitter

 
Women's association football clubs in the Republic of Ireland
Association football clubs in Dún Laoghaire–Rathdown
Waves
University and college association football clubs in the Republic of Ireland
Former Women's National League (Ireland) teams
Dublin Women's Soccer League teams
Association football clubs established in 1966
1966 establishments in Ireland